Sarah Knafo (born 24 April 1993) is a French magistrate for the Court of Audit, civil servant, author and political activist.

Biography
Knafo was born in Les Pavillons-sous-Bois to a family of Maghrebi Jewish ancestry who had roots in Algeria and Morocco. Her grandparents moved to France in the wake of the Six Day War in response to the rise of Arab nationalism in North Africa. Her mother works as a hypnotherapist and her father is a businessman. Knafo moved to Paris as a teenager.

Professional career
Knafo graduated with a degree in public administration at Sciences Po after a Baccalauréat in 2011 and then economics and political science at the Sorbonne in 2014. During her studies, she worked as an intern at the French embassy in Libya (at the time relocated to Tunisia). During that time, she also conducted research into illegal immigration routes from Africa into Europe. In 2020, she began working as a civil servant in Seine-Saint-Denis and became a magistrate.

In 2021, L'Express reported that she has been advising Éric Zemmour, a friend of her family, in the event of putting his name for the candidacy for the 2022 French presidential election. L'Obs magazine also claimed she had facilitated meetings between Zemmour and Nicolas Dupont-Aignan, as well as Laurent Wauquiez and Marion Maréchal. In October 2021, she was named as one of Zemmour's campaign directors for his presidential campaign bid and Reconquête party.

Personal life
Knafo previously had a relationship with Louis Sarkozy, the son of former President Nicolas Sarkozy. In 2021, she allegedly had an affair with Zemmour. Regarding her beliefs, Knafo has described herself as Jewish but influenced by Christian culture.

References

1993 births
Living people
French magistrates
French civil servants
Reconquête politicians
Éric Zemmour
French people of Algerian-Jewish descent
French people of Moroccan-Jewish descent
20th-century French Jews
21st-century French Jews
Pantheon-Sorbonne University alumni
Sciences Po alumni
École nationale d'administration alumni
Judges of the Court of Audit (France)
People from Seine-Saint-Denis